The bare-crowned antbird (Gymnocichla nudiceps) is a species of bird in the family Thamnophilidae in the monotypic genus Gymnocichla.

It is found in Belize, Colombia, Costa Rica, Guatemala, Honduras, Mexico, Nicaragua, and Panama.
Its natural habitat is subtropical or tropical moist lowland forests.

The genus Gymnocichla was erected by the English zoologist Philip Sclater in 1858.

References

Thamnophilidae
Birds described in 1850
Taxonomy articles created by Polbot